Tim Harvey (born 14 October 1936) is a production designer of film and television.  He has been nominated for an Oscar for his work on Hamlet (1996) with another 5 other award wins and seven nominations.

Harvey worked for RTÉ the Irish State Television Service and then the BBC before moving to film.

Television credits
 Pennies from Heaven
 I, Claudius

Film credits 
 Henry V (1989)
 Much Ado About Nothing (1993)
 Frankenstein (1994)
 In the Bleak Midwinter (1995)
 Othello (1995)
 Hamlet (1996)
 Love's Labour's Lost (2000)
 As You Like It (2006)
 The Magic Flute (2006)
 Sleuth (2007)

References

External links
 

British film designers
1936 births
Living people
Emmy Award winners
BAFTA winners (people)